was a town located in Ōita District, Ōita Prefecture, Japan. Yufuin is now a district within the city of Yufu. Its elevation is approximately 400 meters above ground.

As of 2003, the town had an estimated population of 11,342 and density of 88.77 persons per km². The total area was 127.77 km².

On October 1, 2005, Yufuin, along with the towns of Hasama and Shonai (all from Ōita District), was merged to create the city of Yufu. This controversial decision resulted in the recall of the mayor and a snap election in which he regained office.

Located in a green valley beneath the spectacular Mount Yufu (由布岳), a short walk from the town centre is a mix of paddy fields, housing and upmarket ryokan, with a few temples. Mount Yufu, or Yufu-dake, can be hiked in about 90 minutes. A common evening sound is the rhythmic ringing of temple bells.  Although still connected to its rural roots, Yufuin is a tourist town and a popular destination for coach tours. There is a picturesque lake, and rivers flow down and across the valley. Some hotels have outdoor baths called rotenburo with a view of the mountain.

Spa town

Yufuin is famous for natural hot spring , resulting in a local economy based on domestic tourism, gift shops and hot-spring bathing. Some onsen are available to day tourists, but many are strictly for overnight guests. There are also "sento", which are the traditional public baths used by locals. One of these, the Shitanyu, can be used by tourists, while the others are for use by local residents only. International tourist visits to Yufuin are increasing, especially by Koreans.

Sights & Sounds

Yufu Mountain (由布岳) and Golden Scale Lake are commonly viewed and photographed by tourists.

Annual events
 July: Yufuin Music Festival (ゆふいん音楽祭)
 August: Yufuin Film Festival (湯布院映画祭)
 October: Ushikurai Shouting Tournament (牛喰い絶叫大会)

Transportation options

 Kyushu Railway Company, Yufuin Station (由布院駅)
 Highway bus from Fukuoka

TV drama
 Yufuin is the setting for the NHK Japanese television drama "Kaze no Haruka"

See also
Municipal mergers and dissolutions in Japan
Mergers and dissolutions in Oita-ken
Resort town

References

External links
 Yufu official website 

Dissolved municipalities of Ōita Prefecture
Spa towns in Japan
Tourism in Japan